Antrop Varabiev is a Romanian sprint canoer who competed in the early to mid-1970s. He won a complete set of medals in the K-2 10000 m event at the ICF Canoe Sprint World Championships (gold: 1974, silver: 1973, bronze: 1971).

References

Living people
Romanian male canoeists
Year of birth missing (living people)
ICF Canoe Sprint World Championships medalists in kayak